This is a list of records and statistics of the FIFA U-20 World Cup.

Debut of national teams

Overall team records
In this ranking 3 points are awarded for a win, 1 for a draw and 0 for a loss. As per statistical convention in football, matches decided in extra time are counted as wins and losses, while matches decided by penalty shoot-outs are counted as draws. Teams are ranked by total points, then by goal difference, then by goals scored.
.

Former countries

Comprehensive team results by tournament
Legend
 — Champions
 — Runners-up
 — Third place
 — Fourth place
QF — Quarter-finals (since 1979; round of 16)
R2 — Round 2 (since 1997; round of 16)
R1 — Round 1 (group stage)
 — Did not qualify 
 — Did not enter / Withdrew / Banned
 — Country did not exist or national team was inactive
 — Hosts
Q — Qualified for upcoming tournament

For each tournament, the number of teams in each finals tournament are shown (in parentheses).

Teams that have finished in the top four

1 = includes results representing Yugoslavia
2 = includes results representing Soviet Union
3 = includes results representing West Germany

Results of defending champions

Results of host nations

Result of confederation

AFC

CAF

CONCACAF

CONMEBOL

OFC

UEFA

Awards
At the end of each FIFA U-20 World Cup tournament, several awards are presented to the players and teams which have distinguished themselves in various aspects of the game.

There are four awards:

the Golden Ball (commercially termed "adidas Golden Ball") for best player assigned by members of the media;
the Golden Boot (commercially termed "adidas Golden Boot" for best scorer;
the Golden Glove Award (commercially termed "adidas Golden Glove" for the best goalkeeper assigned since 2009 FIFA U-20 World Cup;
the FIFA Fair Play Trophy for the team that advanced to the second round with the best record of fair play;

Golden Ball
The Adidas Golden Ball award is awarded to the player who plays the most outstanding football during the tournament. It is selected by the media poll. Since the 2007 tournament, those who finish as runners-up in the vote receive the Silver Ball and Bronze Ball awards as the second and third most outstanding players in the tournament respectively.

Golden Boot
The Golden Boot (known commercially as the Adidas Golden Shoe) is awarded to the top goalscorer of the tournament. If more than one players are equal by same goals, the players will be selected based by the most assists made and, if still tied, less playing minutes recorded during the tournament.

Golden Glove
The Golden Glove is awarded to the best goalkeeper of the tournament.

FIFA Fair Play Award
FIFA Fair Play Award is given to the team who has the best fair play record during the tournament with the criteria set by FIFA Fair Play Committee.

Records and statistics
 Most World Cup appearances 18, 
 Most consecutive finals tournaments 16,  (1981–2011)
 Most tournament wins (player) 2, three players:
 Fernando Brassard (1989 and 1991)
 João Vieira Pinto (1989 and 1991)
 Sergio Agüero (2005 and 2007)
 Largest win margin in one match 12 goals ( 12–0 , 30 May 2019)
 Most goals scored in a match by a single player 9 goals (Erling Haaland for  against , 30 May 2019)

See also
 FIFA U-17 World Cup records and statistics

Notes

References
 FIFA U-20 World Cup History Section

FIFA U-20 World Cup records and statistics